David Isaacs is an American screenwriter and producer.  He has written episodes of M*A*S*H, Cheers, its spin-off Frasier, and The Simpsons with Ken Levine.

Isaacs became a consulting producer and writer for the AMC television drama Mad Men for the show's second season.  He won the Writers Guild of America Award for Best Dramatic Series at the February 2009 ceremony for his work on the second season.

He is currently a professor and Chair of the writing division at the University of Southern California in Los Angeles, where he teaches comedy and screenwriting.

References

External links 

 
 David Isaacs at the UCLA Extension Writers' Program
 David Isaacs at the University of Southern California

American male screenwriters
American television writers
Living people
Place of birth missing (living people)
Writers Guild of America Award winners
American male television writers
Screenwriters from California
Screenwriting instructors
Year of birth missing (living people)